Buccleuch Mansion is located in Buccleuch Park in New Brunswick in Middlesex County, New Jersey, along the Raritan River.

History
The house was originally built in 1739 by Anthony White, son-in-law of Lewis Morris, a colonial governor of New Jersey.  White built the house for his bride Elizabeth Morris. Their son Anthony Walton White sided with the revolutionaries against the King in the American Revolutionary War. The house was previously known as "The White House Farm." The house was bought by Colonel Joseph Warren Scott in 1821. The house and lands were deeded to the City of New Brunswick to be used as a park in 1911.

Today, the house is looked after by the Jersey Blue chapter of the Daughters of the American Revolution (DAR). Tours are given  on Sundays from June through October, and at other times by appointment. The house is decorated with Federal and Victorian furnishings, many of which belonged to the Scott family, owners during much of the 19th century.

Buccleuch is not to be confused with the Buckelew Mansion in Jamesburg, another historic white-painted house in Middlesex County.

Timeline
1739 Built by Anthony White
1780 Owned by Charles Stewart, Colonel in the 1780s and was visited by several prominent men, such as George Washington, Alexander Hamilton, General Kosciusko, General Gates, and John Hancock.
1821 Joseph Warren Scott (1778–1871) buys "The White House" from Mary Garnett and renames it "Buccleuch" on June 6
1871 Death of Joseph Warren Scott (1778–1871)
1911 Anthony Dey, grandson of Joseph Warren Scott (1778–1871), donated his home and  88 acres of woodland and fertile farmland to the City of New Brunswick, NJ

See also
List of the oldest buildings in New Jersey

References

External links 

DAR: Buccleuch Mansion
City of New Brunswick Parks Department

Buildings and structures in New Brunswick, New Jersey
Houses on the National Register of Historic Places in New Jersey
Historic house museums in New Jersey
Museums in Middlesex County, New Jersey
Houses in Middlesex County, New Jersey
Tourist attractions in New Brunswick, New Jersey
National Register of Historic Places in Middlesex County, New Jersey
Daughters of the American Revolution museums